Caldoveiro Peak (Pico Caldoveiro) is a protected mountain range in Asturias, Northern Spain, with a maximum peak of 1,357 meters, near the village of Villabre.  It spans the parishes of Yernes, Proaza, Tameza, Grau (Grado), and Teberga (Teverga).  Minerals found in Caldoveiro mines include Fluorite, Calcite, and Quartz.  The Asturian administration uses Caldoveiro Peak in its tourism advertising, describing the mountain range as so:

Travel

One Spanish source indicates that Caldoveiro Peak is "a nice walk in the surroundings of the Ports of Maravio..."

References

Mountains of Asturias